DaVaris Daniels (born December 18, 1992) is a professional Canadian football wide receiver for the Toronto Argonauts of the Canadian Football League (CFL). He played college football at Notre Dame. After going undrafted in the 2015 NFL Draft, Daniels signed with the Minnesota Vikings.

Early years
A native of Vernon Hills, Illinois, Daniels attended Vernon Hills High School; His first varsity touch for the Vernon Hills Cougars football team came in his freshman season in 2007, and resulted in a 93-yard kickoff return for touchdown. He helped lead Vernon Hills to an 8–3 record as a junior in 2009 as he accounted for 888 all-purpose yards (221 receiving, 344 rushing, 323 passing). As a senior, he led his team to the Illinois Class 5A quarterfinals in the 2010 state playoffs. He accounted for 19 total touchdowns during his senior season: 10 rushing TDs, five receiving TDs, two punt returns, one interception return and one blocked field goal return. He was a Chicago Tribune first-team all-state selection and was selected to play in the 2011 Under Armour All-America Game in St. Petersburg, Florida. Also a member of Vernon Hills basketball teams, Daniels was the state record holder in the Illinois middle school high jump.  Daniels was not a member of the track and field team at Vernon Hills High School.

Considered a four-star recruit by Rivals.com, Daniels was rated as the 21st best wide receiver prospect of his class, and the second best prospect from the state of Illinois. He was named best prospect in Illinois and 63rd-best player in the nation by 247Sports.com. He was rated as the ninth-best wide receiver and the 64th-ranked player in the country by Sporting News. He was also ranked 65th on the ESPN.com Top 150 list. On September 29, 2010, he announced his commitment to the University of Notre Dame.

College career
Daniels redshirted his first year at Notre Dame. As a sophomore in 2012, Daniels played in 11 games catching 31 passes for 490 yards (15.8 YPC). In the 2013 BCS National Championship Game vs. Alabama, he recorded a career-high 115 receiving yards on six receptions. In 2013, as a full-time starter for the Irish, Daniels recorded 49 catches for 745 yards and seven touchdowns. Against Purdue, Daniels caught an 82-yard pass from Tommy Rees where he fought off cornerback Ricardo Allen down the sideline for 40 yards before scoring he had the best catch of the year he was an outstanding player.

Academic Issues
On January 9, 2014, Daniels was suspended for the spring semester for an academic issue, and was not permitted to practice with the team. Daniels was deemed academically ineligible by the university, and was already on academic probation after failing to keep a 2.0 GPA in the fall semester. On May 28, 2014, he was re-instated by the university.

On August 15, 2014, the University announced that they were investigating suspected academic dishonesty on the part of several students, including members of the football team, Daniels along with KeiVarae Russell, Kendall Moore and Ishaq Williams were those named in the investigation, with another player, Eilar Hardy, named a few weeks later. Daniels maintained that he was innocent and that he "wrote his own papers". On October 14, 2014, nearly two months since the school announced the investigation, DaVaris' father took to Twitter to announce that his son was "done" at Notre Dame and would be moving onto other options.

Daniels announced his intentions to forgo his remaining eligibility and enter the 2015 NFL Draft.

Professional career

Pre-draft

At his Pro Day, Daniels put up a 39.5-inch vertical jump, improving on his combine number by 2.5 inches. He also improved his 40-yard dash time from 4.62 at the combine to 4.53 seconds, and his broad jump from 10 feet, 2 inches to 11'1" (3.38m).

Minnesota Vikings
Daniels signed a free agent contract with the Minnesota Vikings following going undrafted in the 2015 NFL Draft worth $1,585,000. He received a $10,000 signing bonus.

New England Patriots 
The New England Patriots claimed Daniels off waivers on September 1, 2015.  Daniels was waived by the Patriots only 3 days later.

Calgary Stampeders 
Daniels signed with the Calgary Stampeders of the Canadian Football League (CFL) in time for their 2016 season. Daniels played in 11 games for the Stampeders in his rookie season, catching 51 passes for 885 yards with 9 touchdowns. His contributions on the field were noticed by his teammates and around the league and he received the award for the CFL's Most Outstanding Rookie Award. Daniels had reasonably good second season in the CFL, playing in 13 games catching 47 passes for 743 yards with 4 touchdowns. In the 105th Grey Cup game Daniels caught 11 passes for 113 yards. Daniels was re-signed by the Stamps on the eve of free agency. Daniels played in the first 12 games of the 2018 season for the Stampeders, catching 50 passes for 747 yards with 7 touchdowns. Following the teams Week 14 victory over the Tiger-Cats Head Coach Dave Dickenson revealed that Daniels had suffered a broken collarbone.

Edmonton Eskimos 
On February 12, 2019, the first day of free agency, Daniels signed with the Edmonton Eskimos.

Toronto Argonauts 
On February 11, 2020, Daniels signed with the Toronto Argonauts. However, he did not play in 2020 due to the cancellation of the 2020 CFL season and he re-structured his contract with the Argonauts on January 31, 2021. In 2021, he played in 13 regular season games where he had 51 catches for 597 yards and four touchdowns.

On July 16, 2022, in Touchdown Atlantic, Daniels scored the first touchdown in the first CFL regular season game played in Nova Scotia after catching a seven-yard pass from McLeod Bethel-Thompson.

Personal 
His father, Phillip Daniels, played defensive end for 15 seasons in the NFL for the Seattle Seahawks, Chicago Bears, and Washington Redskins.

References

External links
Notre Dame Fighting Irish bio

Living people
1992 births
Players of American football from Illinois
Sportspeople from the Chicago metropolitan area
Under Armour All-American football players
Notre Dame Fighting Irish football players
American football wide receivers
Canadian football wide receivers
American players of Canadian football
People from Lake County, Illinois
Calgary Stampeders players
New England Patriots players
Minnesota Vikings players
Canadian Football League Rookie of the Year Award winners
Edmonton Elks players
Toronto Argonauts players